Vassalli is a surname of Italian origin. People with that name include:

 Fortanerius Vassalli (died 1361), Italian Franciscan
 Giuliano Vassalli (1915–2009), Italian politician, lecturer and lawyer
 Luigi Vassalli (1812–1887), Italian Egyptologist and patriot
 Mikiel Anton Vassalli (1764–1829), Maltese writer
 Sebastiano Vassalli (1941–2015), Italian writer

See also
 Liceo Vassalli Junior Lyceum, a school in Malta
 

Surnames of Italian origin